Beta Ethniki 1983–84 complete season.

League table

Results

Play-offs

|+1st place play-off

|}

Top scorers

References

External links 
RSSSF.org

Second level Greek football league seasons
Greece
2